Parategeticula martella is a moth of the family Prodoxidae. It is found in southern Coahuila, Mexico.

The wingspan is 16-17.5 mm for males and 19-19.5 mm for females. Adults are on wing in March. They rest inside the flowers of the larval host plant during the day and fall to the ground when disturbed, where they are hardly visible on the sand as they stay immobile.

The larvae feed on Yucca endlichiana. The young larvae probably bore into the young fruit of their host plant, where they feed on developing seeds.

Etymology
The species name is derived from Marte, the type locality in southern Coahuila.

References

Moths described in 2000
Prodoxidae